The FIL World Luge Natural Track Championships, part of the International Luge Federation (FIL) have taken place on an almost biennial basis in non-Winter Olympics years since 1979. These championships are shown for natural tracks. See FIL World Luge Championships for all artificial track events that have taken place since 1955.

Host cities
 1979: Inzing, Austria
 1980: Moos in Passeier, Italy
 1982: Feld am See, Austria
 1984: Kreuth, West Germany
 1986: Fénis-Aosta, Italy
 1988: Montreux, Switzerland (cancelled)
 1990: Gsies, Italy
 1992: Bad Goisern, Austria
 1994: Gsies, Italy
 1996: Oberperfuss, Austria 
 1998: Rautavaara, Finland
 2000: Olang, Italy
 2001: Stein an der Enns, Austria
 2003: Železniki, Slovenia
 2005: Latsch, Italy
 2007: Grande Prairie, Alberta, Canada
 2009: Moos in Passeier, Italy
 2011: Umhausen, Austria
 2013: Deutschnofen, Italy
 2015: Sankt Sebastian, Styria, Austria
 2017 : Vatra Dornei, Romania
 2019: Latzfons, Italy
 2021: Umhausen, Austria
 2023: Deutschnofen, Italy

Men's singles
Debuted: 1979.

Women's singles
Debuted: 1979.

Men's doubles
Debuted: 1979.

Mixed team
Debuted: 2001.

Medal table
Updated as of the 2023 FIL World Luge Natural Track Championships.

References
Men's doubles natural track World Champions
Men's singles natural track World Champions
Mixed teams natural track World Champions
Women's singles natural track World Champions

 
Natural track luge competitions
Recurring sporting events established in 1979
luge